The 2020–21 season was Maccabi Haifa's 63rd season in Israeli Premier League, and their 39th consecutive season in the top division of Israeli football. In this season, the team won its first championship in a decade.

Club

Squad information

Current coaching staff

Transfers

In

Out

Pre-season and friendlies

Competitions

Overview

Ligat Ha'Al

Regular season

Results overview

Regular season table

Play-off

Championship round table

Results overview

Results summary

Results by round

State Cup

Round of 32

Round of 16

Quarter-final

Semi-final

Toto Cup

Group stage

5-6th classification match

UEFA Europa League

Statistics

Squad statistics

Goals

Clean sheets

Disciplinary record for Ligat Ha'Al and State Cup

Suspensions

Penalties

Overall

{|class="wikitable" style="text-align: center;"
|-
!
!Total
!Home
!Away
!Natural
|-
|align=left| Games played        || 48 || 25 || 22 || 1
|-
|align=left| Games won             || 32 || 20 || 12 || -
|- 
|align=left| Games drawn           || 7 || 3 || 4 || -
|-
|align=left| Games lost            || 9 || 1 || 7 || 1
|-
|align=left| Biggest win             || 4-0 vs Ironi Kiryat Shmona  || 4-0 vs Ironi Kiryat Shmona || 3-0 vs Ironi Kiryat Shmona 3-0 vs Bnei Sakhnin 3-0 vs Beitar Jerusalem 3-0 vs F.C. Ashdod || -
|-
|align=left| Biggest loss       || 2-7 vs Tottenham Hotspur || 0-2 vs Maccabi Petah Tikva || 2-7 vs Tottenham Hotspur || 0-2 vs Maccabi Tel Aviv
|-
|align=left| Biggest win (League)    || 4-0 vs Ironi Kiryat Shmona  || 4-0 vs Ironi Kiryat Shmona || 3-0 vs Ironi Kiryat Shmona 3-0 vs Bnei Sakhnin 3-0 vs Beitar Jerusalem 3-0 vs F.C. Ashdod ||
|-
|align=left| Biggest loss (League)   || 0-2 vs Maccabi Petah Tikva || 0-2 vs Maccabi Petah Tikva || 1-2 vs Hapeol Haifa 2-3 vs Hapoel Kfar Saba 1-2 vs Maccabi Tel Aviv 0-1 vs F.C. Ashdod ||
|-
|align=left| Biggest win (Cup)    || 4-1 vs Hapoel Afula || 4-1 vs Hapoel Afula || ||
|-
|align=left| Biggest loss (Cup)     || 0-2 vs Maccabi Tel Aviv || || || 0-2 vs Maccabi Tel Aviv
|-
|align=left| Biggest win (Toto)    || 1-0 vs Ironi Kiryat Shmona 1-0 vs Hapoel Haifa || 1-0 vs Hapoel Haifa || 1-0 vs Ironi Kiryat Shmona ||
|-
|align=left| Biggest loss (Toto)   || 0-1 vs Bnei Sakhnin 0-1 vs Hapoel Be'er Sheva || || 0-1 vs Bnei Sakhnin 0-1 vs Hapoel Be'er Sheva ||
|-
|align=left| Biggest win (Europe)     || 3-1 vs FK Željezničar || 3-1 vs FK Željezničar || 2-1 vs FC Rostov ||
|-
|align=left| Biggest loss (Europe)  || 2-7 vs Tottenham Hotspur || || 2-7 vs Tottenham Hotspur ||
|-
|align=left| Goals scored           || 91 || 53 || 38 || 0
|-
|align=left| Goals conceded         || 46 || 17 || 27 || 2
|-
|align=left| Goal difference         || +45 || +36 || +11 || -2
|-
|align=left| Clean sheets          || 18 || 12 || 6 || -
|-
|-
|-
|align=left| Yellow cards          || 107 || 64 || 39 || 4
|-
|align=left| Red cards              || 0 || 0 || 0 || 0
|-
|align=left| Most appearances      ||colspan=4|  Mohammad Abu Fani (46)
|-
|align=left| Most minutes played   || colspan=4|  Josh Cohen (4,304)
|-
|align=left| Most goals        || colspan=4|   Nikita Rukavytsya (24)
|-
|align=left| Most Assist        || colspan=4|  Dolev Haziza (11)
|-
|align=left|Penalties for   || 13 || 8 || 5 || 
|-
|align=left|Penalties against   || 9 || 2 || 7 ||
|-
|align=left|Penalties saved   || 4 || 1 || 3 ||
|-
|align=left| Winning rate         ||% || % || % || %
|-

Notes

References

External links
 Maccabi Haifa website

Maccabi Haifa F.C. seasons
Maccabi Haifa